The Dobhar-chú, or King Otter, is a creature of Irish folklore. It resembles both a dog and an otter, though it sometimes is described as half dog, half fish. It lives in water and has fur with protective properties. There are little to no written records of the Dobhar-Chú since its legend has relied heavily on oral storytelling and tradition.

Description
Physical description of the Dobhar-Chú resembles an otter but said to be about five times as large (perhaps 10–15 feet), with white pelt, black ear tips and a black cross on its back. Though, due to the murky waters it is said to reside in, its pelt may be portrayed as darker.

Etymology 
 is one of a number of Irish words for 'otter'. The modern Irish word for 'water' is uisce (see whiskey), although dobhar is also (rarely) used. Dobhar is a much older form and cognates are found in other Celtic languages (e.g. Welsh dŵr or dwfr, Cornish Dowrgi 'waterhound/otter' ). Cú is 'hound' in Irish (see for example Cúchulainn, 'Culainn's hound'). The Dobhar-chú is also known as the dobarcu, and anglicised as doyarchu, dhuragoo, dorraghow or anchu.

Headstone 
A headstone, found in Conwall cemetery in Glenade, County Leitrim, depicts the Dobhar-chú and is related to a tale of an attack on a local woman by the creature. The stone is claimed to be the headstone of a grave of a woman killed by the Dobhar-chú in the 18th century.

The monument is a recumbent flag of sandstone about 4 ft. 6ins. by 1 ft. 10 ins. It shows a recumbent animal having body and legs like those of a dog with the characteristic depth of rib and strength of thigh. The tail, long and curved, shows a definite tuft. The rear of the haunch, and still more the tail, are in exceptionally low relief, apparently due to the loss of a thin flake from the face of the slab. So far the description is canine. The lettering, and carving are in relief.

Legend 
In 1722, Grace McGloighlin, locally known as Grace Connolly (her maiden name), lived in the townland of Creevelea at the north-west corner of Glenade Lough. One morning she went down to the lough [lake] to wash some clothes. Some accounts say that her husband, Terrence, rushed to the shore after hearing her scream whilst others say that he went down after she failed to return that evening. Both accounts say Mr. McGloighlin rushed down only to find her mutilated body with the Dobhar-Chú sleeping on top of her. Terrence runs home and grabs a dagger before returning to kill the Dobhar-Chú. As the beast died it let out a whistling yell to its mate, who soon rose from the lough. The second beast chased him from the lough, and after a long and bloody battle, which some accounts say he did not face alone, he killed the second Dobhar-Chú.

See also 
 Ahuizotl (creature)
 Kelpie (Water Horse)
 Lake monster
 Lavellan
 Selkie

References 

Aos Sí
Fairies
Fantasy creatures
Irish folklore
Irish legendary creatures
Mythological dogs
Otters
Tuatha Dé Danann